The University of Minnesota Old Campus Historic District is a historic district located in Minneapolis, Minnesota. Listed in the National Register of Historic Places since 1984, it includes a number of historic buildings that were constructed during the late 1800s and early 1900s. The district represents the oldest extant section of the University of Minnesota campus.

Eddy Hall, 1886

Architect: LeRoy Buffington
The oldest building within the district, as well as the oldest extant building on the Minneapolis campus. Originally built as the Mechanic Arts building, it was designed by Minneapolis architect LeRoy S. Buffington.  Executed in the Queen Anne mode, the building is three stories in height on a high basement; a square tower at the northwest corner dominates the entry. The building is constructed of red brick with red sandstone trim. It is essentially rectangular in plan. Dominant features include the multi-gabled roof, high double-hung windows, panels of patterned brick, and iron cresting with weather vane on the tower.

Erected at a cost of $30,000 in 1886, the building received a $10,000 addition in 1903. The building originally housed the Mathematics, Drawing, Civil-Municipal-Structural Engineering departments, as well as testing laboratories. The Mechanic Arts building was eventually renamed Eddy Hall in honor of Henry Turner Eddy, former professor of Engineering and Mathematics and later Dean of the Graduate School.

Music Education, 1888 (demolished 2010)
Architect: Warren H. Hayes
Originally the Student Christian Association building. It once housed the Child Welfare and Music Education departments. On July 8, 2009 the University of Minnesota Board of Regents moved to demolish the building. According to the Regents, the excessive cost of renovation was the main deterrent against any reuse option. Demolition commenced in May 2010 with an expected cost of $432,000.

Pillsbury Hall, 1889
Architects: LeRoy Buffington with Harvey Ellis
Originally known as Science Hall, it was renamed in honor of Governor John S. Pillsbury during construction. Harvey Ellis, Buffington's assistant, was responsible for the Richardsonian Romanesque details of the design. Though Ellis was inspired by the aesthetic of Henry Hobson Richardson, the building also contains elements of the Prairie School, Arts and Crafts, Gothic, and Victorian styles. The building is built with two different colors of sandstone. The buff-colored sandstone is from quarries near Banning State Park, while the red sandstone is from the Fond du Lac formation. The clay tile roof and copper eaves serve to protect the sandstone from the infiltration of water, and they also add to the appearance of the building. Reflecting its earthen architectural elements, the building housed the Newton Horace Winchell School of Earth Sciences until 2017. The building is currently slated for rehabilitation, after which it will house the university's English department.

Pattee Hall, 1889
Architect: J. Walter Stevens
The first University of Minnesota Law School building, itself founded in 1888. The Law School later moved to Fraser Hall and then to Mondale Hall. Today the building houses the Institute on Community Integration. It is named after William S. Pattee, first dean of the Law School.

Nicholson Hall, 1890
Architects:  LeRoy Buffington with Harvey Ellis
Originally built as a chemistry laboratory, until that department moved to Northrop Mall. It later served as the men's student union until Coffman Memorial Union opened in 1940. Nicholson Hall is named after Edward E. Nicholson, Dean of Student Affairs from 1917 to 1941.

The building was recently rehabilitated with $24 million of structural improvements and interior updates. While much of the building's Richardsonian Romanesque exterior was restored during the project, new Art Nouveau motifs were introduced throughout the interior. The building reopened to the public in January 2006 and is currently used for a number of classroom and administrative purposes.

Wulling Hall, 1892

Architects: Allen Stem and Charles Reed
Originally built as Medical Hall, it later served as the Pharmacy building. Today it houses the Office of Classroom Management.

Burton Hall, 1894

Architects:  LeRoy Buffington and Charles Sumner Sedgwick
Named in honor of university president Miriam Burton, it was the main library building on campus until Walter Library opened in 1924. Before Burton Hall was built, the library collection was housed in Old Main. A series of fires in Old Main convinced the Board of Regents that a new, fireproof building was needed. President William Watts Folwell first consulted with LeRoy Buffington on a library design, but the Regents overruled him. After much debate between the Regents and the faculty, the design was eventually finalized. In an act of compromise, the exterior was designed by Buffington in a severe Greek Revival style and the interior was designed by Charles Sedgwick in a rather ornate Victorian style. The building originally included an assembly hall which doubled as a chapel. The building is currently home to the College of Education and Human Development.

Armory, 1896

Architect: Charles Aldrich
Originally built for athletics and military drills, it is now home to the university's ROTC program.

Wesbrook Hall, 1898 (demolished 2011)
Architect: Frederick Corser
Originally the Laboratory of Medical Science. It became the home of the Dentistry department in 1912 and later served as the location of the Department of Writing Studies. Wesbrook Hall was demolished in August 2011 as part of the Northrop Auditorium renovation project.

Jones Hall, 1901
Architect: Charles Aldrich
The first home of the Physics department.  The Beaux-Arts structure was rehabilitated in 2005 to provide updated mechanical systems and ADA access. Historic features such as stair treads and banisters, paneled doors, arched ceilings, and terra cotta facade were preserved during the project.  The building is now home to the Freshman Admissions Welcome Center as well as the College of Liberal Arts language lab.

Child Development, 1903
Architect: Clarence H. Johnston Sr.
Originally built as the Mines Building until damaged by fire in 1913. The building was later used for the University High School and ultimately the Child Development Center.

Shevlin Hall, 1906

Architect: Ernest Kennedy
Built on the site of Old Main, the first building on campus. Shevlin Hall served as the women's student union until Coffman Memorial Union opened in 1940. The building, a gift from Minneapolis lumberman Thomas H. Shevlin (1852-1912), named in honor of his wife Alice Ann Hall Shevlin (1864-1910), currently houses the Speech-Language-Hearing Sciences department.

Folwell Hall, 1907
Architect: Clarence H. Johnston Sr.
Designed in the Jacobethan Revival style by Minnesota State Architect Clarence H. Johnston, it was built to house departments displaced after the burning of Old Main in 1904. These included the Pedagogy, Oratory, and Psychology departments, as well as the Alumni Magazine, German Museum, Gopher Yearbook, and Minnesota Daily. It is now home to a majority of the university's foreign language departments.

The building, which received an extensive rehabilitation in 2012, is considered one of the most elaborate on campus. Its exterior features carved brick detailing, balustrades, parapets, gargoyles, and many chimneys. Interior features include polished marble hallways, fireplaces, and ornate staircases.

Folwell Hall is named in honor of William Watts Folwell, the first president of the University of Minnesota.

References

University of Minnesota
National Register of Historic Places in Minneapolis
Romanesque Revival architecture in Minnesota
University and college buildings on the National Register of Historic Places in Minnesota
Historic districts on the National Register of Historic Places in Minnesota